André Malinet (28 June 1877 – 20 May 1956) was a French figure skater. He competed in the men's singles event at the 1924 Winter Olympics.

References

External links
 

1877 births
1956 deaths
French male single skaters
Olympic figure skaters of France
Figure skaters at the 1924 Winter Olympics
Place of birth missing